Elko Mrduljaš (25 September 1909 – 28 July 1991) was a Yugoslav rower. He competed at the 1936 Summer Olympics in Berlin with the men's coxed pair where they came sixth.

References

1909 births
1991 deaths
Yugoslav male rowers
Olympic rowers of Yugoslavia
Rowers at the 1936 Summer Olympics
Rowers from Split, Croatia
European Rowing Championships medalists
Burials at Lovrinac Cemetery